Anthony John Coyle (born 17 January 1960) is a Scottish former professional footballer who played as a winger. He made 46 Scottish League appearances for Albion Rovers and more than 300 in the English Football League for Stockport County (242 league matches in two spells), Chesterfield and Exeter City. He also played 15 times, scoring once, for Northwich Victoria in the 1989–90 Football Conference, and spent just over a season with Northern Premier League club Hyde United. After retiring from professional football he worked for the Benefits Agency.

References

1960 births
Living people
Footballers from Glasgow
Scottish footballers
Association football wingers
Albion Rovers F.C. players
Stockport County F.C. players
Chesterfield F.C. players
Northwich Victoria F.C. players
Exeter City F.C. players
Hyde United F.C. players
Scottish Football League players
English Football League players
National League (English football) players
Northern Premier League players